Lecanora lichexanthona is a species of crustose and saxicolous (rock-dwelling) lichen  in the family Lecanoraceae. Found in Brazil, it was formally described as a new species in 2000 by lichenologist Roland Guderley. The type specimen was collected by Klaus Kalb in a closed cerradão between Rio Verde de Mato Grosso and Coxim where it was found growing on siliceous rock. The specific epithet lichexanthona refers to the presence of the chemical lichexanthone as a major secondary in the lichen. Other compounds in the lichen are atranorin, hybocarpone, constipatic acid, and norlichexanthone (the last three occurring as minor compounds).

See also
List of Lecanora species

References

lichexanthona
Lichen species
Lichens described in 2000
Lichens of West-Central Brazil